Siempre en Mi Corazón — Always in My Heart: The Songs of Ernesto Lecuona is a studio album recorded by Spanish tenor Plácido Domingo. It was produced by Milt Okun and released by CBS Records in 1983. The album includes songs written by Cuban musician Ernesto Lecuona and won Domingo a Grammy Award for Best Latin Pop Performance in 1985.

Track listing
All tracks written by Ernesto Lecuona.

Personnel

 Plácido Domingo - vocals
 Barry Griffiths - conductor
 Royal Philharmonic Orchestra
 Lee Holdridge - arranger and director
 Alf Clausen - arranger

References

1983 albums
Plácido Domingo albums
Albums arranged by Lee Holdridge
Albums produced by Milt Okun
CBS Records albums
Tribute albums
Grammy Award for Best Latin Pop Album
Spanish-language albums